Benstonite is a mineral with formula Ba6Ca6Mg(CO3)13. Discovered in 1954, the mineral was described in 1961 and named after Orlando J. Benston (1901–1966).

Description and occurrence
Benstonite is translucent and white, pale yellow, or pale yellow-brown in color. The mineral occurs as cleavable masses; cleavage fragments are nearly perfectly rhombohedral in shape. On large specimens, the faces exhibit a mosaic structure similar to that in some specimens of dolomite and siderite. Benstonite fluoresces red or yellow under x-rays and longwave and shortwave ultraviolet. The mineral also exhibits strong red phosphorescence.

Benstonite is known to occur in Canada, China, India, Italy, Namibia, Russia, Sweden, and the United States. It occurs in association with alstonite, barite, barytocalcite, calcite, daqingshanite, fluorite, huntite, monazite, phlogopite, pyrite, sphalerite, strontianite, and quartz.

Synthesis
The mineral was first synthesized in 1973 during a study of the Ba-Mg-Ca-CO3 system in aqueous solution. At room temperature, a solution containing proportional quantities of magnesium chloride, barium chloride, and calcium chloride was prepared, to which sodium carbonate was added. The solution immediately precipitated, and after sitting for two weeks, the precipitate was identified as nearly pure benstonite.

History
Orlando J. Benston of Malvern, Arkansas, visited a barite mine near the Magnet Cove igneous complex on New Year's Eve, 1954. He collected samples of a mineral that he guessed might be alstonite or  barytocalcite on the basis of qualitative tests. Friedrich Lippmann identified it as a new mineral and described it in the journal Naturwissenschaften in 1961. He named it Benstonite in honor of Benston.

Type specimens are held at Victor Goldschmidt University in Germany and the National Museum of Natural History in the United States.

References

Bibliography

Further reading

External links

Trigonal minerals
Minerals in space group 148
Carbonate minerals
Magnesium minerals
Calcium minerals
Barium minerals